Huitzilac is a city in the Mexican state of Morelos.

The city serves as the municipal seat for the surrounding municipality of the same name. With a 2010 census population of 4,568 inhabitants, it is the second-largest city (locality) in the municipality, after the town of Tres Marias.

The municipality reported 19,231 inhabitants in the 2015 census.

The name is a Spanish-language adaptation of a Nahuatl toponym meaning "in the water of the humming-birds".

The municipality
The municipality is one of 17 municipalities that border Mexico City. It borders the capital city's southside boroughs of Milpa Alta and Tlalpan. Ulises Pardo Bastida of Juntos Haremos Historia (Together we will make history coalition) was elected Presidente Municipal (mayor) in the election of July 1, 2018.

Towns and villages
The largest localities (cities, towns, and villages) are:

History

During the Prehispanic era, Huitzilac was a part of the domain of Cuahanahuac (Cuernavaca). After the Conquest (1521), it became a part of the Marquesado del Valle de Oaxaca. The town was an important stagecoach stop on the route from Mexico City to Cuernavaca, but this changed with the construction of the railroad in 1897. huitzilac (Dec 14, 2018)

During the Revolution, General Genovevo de la O fought against the government. Huitizlac was burned in April 1912, and de la O was able to mobilize 4,000 men plus artillery to join in the fight to liberate Cuernavaca. Thanks to the popularity of the Ejercicio Libertador del Sur in this region, Huitizalc and Santa María Ahuacatitlán were able to forget their old rivalries.

Iron crosses have been erected at Km 47 of the federal Mexico City-Cuernavaca highway to commemorate Francisco R. Serrano and his associates, Daniel and Miguel A. Peralta, Carlos Ariza, Carlos Vidal, Rafael Martínez de Escobar, Cecilio González, Enrique Monteverde, Alonso Capetillo Robles, Augusto Peña, Antonio Jáuregui, José Valle Arce, Octavio Almada, and Ernesto Noriega Méndez. On October 3, 1927, Serrano (a candidate for president) and his men were assassinated on the orders of PresidentAlvaro Obregon. Martín Luis Guzman describes the incident in his novel, La sombra del caudillo.

On June 18, 2019, twelve Federal Police agents were sentenced to 34 years of prison for the August 24, 2012 murder of two CIA agents in Tres Marias.

As of May 4, 2020, there were 505 infections and 59 deaths in the state of Morelos and four confirmed infections from the COVID-19 pandemic in Huitzilac. Schools and many businesses were closed from mid March until June 1. On June 2, Huitzilac reported eleven confirmed cases and three deaths from the virus; the reopening of the state was pushed back until at least June 13. Toxic medical waste was found at Km 49 of the Mexican Federal Highway 95D near the monument to Josė María Morelos y Pavón in Tres Marias; four toll collectors who work for Federal Roads and Bridges and Related Services, (CAPUFE) in Morelos have died from the coronavirus. Huitzilac reported 30 cases, 24 recuperations, and six deaths from the virus as of August 31. Sixty-four cases were reported on December 27, 2020.

Tourist Attractions
Tres Marías (Three Marys mountain) and its restaurants. The town is also a popular meeting point for motorcyclists, especially on weekends.
Chichinautzin Biological Corridor. The Ajusco Chichinautzin Biological Corridor is a protected natural area with a remarkable diversity of habitats and species due to its privileged geographic and climatic conditions. In the Chichinautzin Corridor there are 315 species of fungi (more than 80 edible), 10 species of amphibians, 43 species of reptiles, 1,348 species of insects and spiders, 237 of birds (36 exclusive to this region), 5 species of fish, 785 of plants, and 7 types of vegetation in addition to forests of pine, oyamel and oak. The corridor includes the second and third highest peaks in Morelos: Sierra Chichinautzin and Los Cumbres/Tres Marias 
 Lagunas de Zempoala National Park. Visitors can fly kites, hike, camp, and ride horses.
Food: Barbacoa (barbecue mutton) and pulque (a beer-like drink made from fermented mezcal).
Iglesia de San Juan Bautista (Church of St. John the Baptist), built 1623. There are two festivals: June 24 and September 1.
La Pera lookout on the Mexico City-Cuernavaca tollway.
Handicrafts: wooden furniture
Los Columpios (The swings). Visitors of all ages will enjoy the day on the rope swings in this park. Picnicking and camping allowed. You can rent ARVs or go on a zip-line. Restaurant and convenience store.
Monument to José María Morelos y Pavon. This monument to the Hero of Independence for whom the state is named is located at Km 46.9 of the Mexico City-Cuernavaca highway, which opened in 1952. The original 7-meter stone statue was designed by Everardo Hernández in 1954, but this was demolished and replaced with a bronze statue by Ernesto Tamariz, Artemio Silva, and Eduardo Tamariz in 1986. The statue was severely vandalized in December 2012.

Culture
The most important festival in Huitzilac is celebrated on March 19, in honor of the town's patron saint, San Jose. An image of St. Joseph disappeared from the church during the Mexican Revolution and was recovered on September 1, 1921, so there is a festival to remember this event. There are also celebrations during Holy Week (March or April) and in honor of Our Lady of Guadalupe on December 12. The Holy Trinity is celebrated in Fierro del Toro on January 1. San Buen Aventura is celebrated on July 15 in Coajomulco. St. Joseph is also honored in Tres Marias on March 19.

Traditions
Pulque and cured fruit drinks are prepared in the area. Local craftsmen make wooden furniture. Chinelos dance at local festivals.

Physical Geography
morelos.gob/huitzilac
Huitzilac has an area of 190 km2 (73 miles2), which represents 3.84% of the territory in the state. The average altitude is 2,500 m (8,200 ft.) above sea level.

Climate
The municipality has a subtropical humid climate with a well-defined winter. The average annual temperature is 12 °C (53.6 °F) and the average annual precipitation is 1,358 mm (53.4").

Terrain
There are many mountain peaks in the area, 2,250 or more meters above sea level.

Volcán Ocotecatl, 19°05'N 99°02'W, 3,480 m
Sierra Chichinautzin: 3,470 m (11,398 ft.)
Volcán Chalchihuites: 3,440 m
Cerro de Tres Marías: 3,280 m (10,761 ft.)
Volcán Cuespalapa, Tres Marias: 3,270 m
Cerros de Tepeyahualco, Tuxtepec: both over 3,250 m (10,663 ft.)
Cerro de la Manteca: 3,200 m (10,500 ft.)
Cerro de Tezoyo: 3,180 m
Cerros de Zacolocohaya, del Mirador, de Piedra Quila, de Zempoala, de Ojo de Arezacapa: all over 3,000 m (9,840 ft.)

Lakes & Rivers
The Lakes of Zempoala and several intermittent streams.Exploring Mexico: Zempoala

Soil

Land use
3,035 ha (7,500 acres) for agriculture
3,051 ha (7,539 acres) for fishing
7,002 ha (17,302 acres) for forest

Land distribution
440 ha (1,087 acres) ejidos
19,388 ha (47,909 acres) communal property
9,693 ha (23,952 acres) private land

Flora & Fauna
The flora consists mostly of oak and pine forests. The fauna includes white-tail deer, raccoons, skunks, squirrels, volcano rats, mountain lions, quail, mountain hens, woodpeckers, blue magpies, goldfinches, rattlesnakes, garter snakes, frogs, and lizards. Trout live in the streams.

See also

 Mexican Revolution
 List of people from Morelos, Mexico
 Governors of Morelos
 Genovevo de la O
 Lagunas de Zempoala National Park
 Morelos

External links
Hutizilac municipal government website Accessed 31 October 2008.
Hutizilac Enciclopedia de los Municipios de México, INAFED. Accessed 31 October 2008.
 Photos and Information

References

Municipalities of Morelos
Populated places in Morelos
Nahua settlements